Lottery mathematics is used to calculate probabilities of winning or losing a lottery game. It is based primarily on combinatorics, particularly the twelvefold way and  combinations without replacement.

Choosing 6 from 49
In a typical 6/49 game, each player chooses six distinct numbers from a range of 1-49. If the six numbers on a ticket match the numbers drawn by the lottery, the ticket holder is a jackpot winner—regardless of the order of the numbers. The probability of this happening is 1 in 13,983,816.

The chance of winning can be demonstrated as follows: The first number drawn has a 1 in 49 chance of matching. When the draw comes to the second number, there are now only 48 balls left in the bag, because the balls are drawn without replacement. So there is now a 1 in 48 chance of predicting this number.

Thus for each of the 49 ways of choosing the first number there are 48 different ways of choosing the second. This means that the probability of correctly predicting 2 numbers drawn from 49 in the correct order is calculated as 1 in 49 × 48. On drawing the third number there are only 47 ways of choosing the number; but of course we could have arrived at this point in any of 49 × 48 ways, so the chances of correctly predicting 3 numbers drawn from 49, again in the correct order, is 1 in 49 × 48 × 47.

608281864034267560872252163321295376887552831379210240000000000 / 60415263063373835637355132068513997507264512000000000 = 10068347520

This works out to 10,068,347,520, which is much bigger than the ~14 million stated above. 

Perm(49,6)=10068347520 and 49 nPr 6 =10068347520. 

However; the order of the 6 numbers is not significant for the payout! That is, if a ticket has the numbers 1, 2, 3, 4, 5, and 6, it wins as long as all the numbers 1 through 6 are drawn, no matter what order they come out in. Accordingly, given any combination of 6 numbers, there are 6 × 5 × 4 × 3 × 2 × 1 = 6! or 720 orders in which they can be drawn.

, where n is the number of alternatives and k is the number of choices.  Further information is available at binomial coefficient and multinomial coefficient.

This function is called the combination function, COMBIN(n,k). For the rest of this article, we will use the notation . "Combination" means the group of numbers selected, irrespective of the order in which they are drawn. A combination of numbers is usually presented in ascending order. An eventual 7th drawn number, the reserve or bonus, is presented at the end.

An alternative method of calculating the odds is to note that the probability of the first ball corresponding to one of the six chosen is 6/49; the probability of the second ball corresponding to one of the remaining five chosen is 5/48; and so on.  This yields a final formula of

A 7th ball often is drawn as reserve  ball, in the past only a second chance to get 5+1 numbers correct with 6 numbers played.

Odds of getting other possibilities in choosing 6 from 49
One must divide the number of combinations producing the given result by the total number of possible combinations (for example). The numerator equates to the number of ways to select the winning numbers multiplied by the number of ways to select the losing numbers.

For a score of n (for example, if 3 choices match three of the 6 balls drawn, then n  = 3),  describes the odds of selecting n winning numbers from the 6 winning numbers. This means that there are 6 - n losing numbers, which are chosen from the 43 losing numbers in  ways. The total number of combinations giving that result is, as stated above, the first number multiplied by the second. The expression is therefore .

This can be written in a general form for all lotteries as:

The generalisation of this formula is called the hypergeometric distribution.

This gives the following results:

When a 7th number is drawn as bonus number then we have 49!/6!/1!/42!.=combin(49,6)*combin(49-6,1)=601304088 different possible drawing results.

You would expect to score 3 of 6 or better once in around 36.19 drawings. Notice that It takes a 3 if 6 wheel of 163 combinations to be sure of at least one 3/6 score. 

1/p changes when several distinct combinations are played together. It mostly is about winning something, not just the jackpot.

Ensuring to win the jackpot
There is only one known way to ensure winning the jackpot. That is to buy at least one lottery ticket for every possible number combination. For example, one has to buy 13,983,816 different tickets to ensure to win the jackpot in a 6/49 game.

Lottery organizations have laws, rules and safeguards in place to prevent gamblers from executing such an operation. Further, just winning the jackpot by buying every possible combination does not guarantee to break even or make a profit.

If  is the probability to win; the cost of a ticket;  the cost for obtaining a ticket (e.g. including the logistics);  one time costs for the operation (such as setting up and conducting the operation); then the jackpot  should contain at least

to have a chance to at least break even.

The above theoretical "chance to break-even" point is slightly offset by the sum  of the minor wins also included in all the lottery tickets:

Still, even if the above relation is satisfied, it does not guarantee to break even. The payout depends on the number of winning tickets for all the prizes , resulting in the relation

In probably the only known successful operations the threshold to execute an operation was set at three times the cost of the tickets alone for unknown reasons
 

I.e.

This does, however, not eliminate all risks to make no profit. The success of the operations still depended on a bit of luck. In addition, in one operation the logistics failed and not all combinations could be obtained. This added the risk of not even winning the jackpot at all.

Powerballs and bonus balls

Many lotteries have a Powerball (or "bonus ball"). If the powerball is drawn from a pool of numbers different from the main lottery, the odds are multiplied by the number of powerballs. For example, in the 6 from 49 lottery, given 10 powerball numbers, then the odds of getting a score of 3 and the powerball would be 1 in 56.66 × 10, or 566.6 (the probability would be divided by 10, to give an exact value of ). Another example of such a game is Mega Millions, albeit with different jackpot odds.

Where more than 1 powerball is drawn from a separate pool of balls to the main lottery (for example, in the EuroMillions game), the odds of the different possible powerball matching scores are calculated using the method shown in the "other scores" section above (in other words, the powerballs are like a mini-lottery in their own right), and then multiplied by the odds of achieving the required main-lottery score.

If the powerball is drawn from the same pool of numbers as the main lottery, then, for a given target score, the number of winning combinations includes the powerball. For games based on the Canadian lottery (such as the lottery of the United Kingdom), after the 6 main balls are drawn, an extra ball is drawn from the same pool of balls, and this becomes the powerball (or "bonus ball"). An extra prize is given for matching 5 balls and the bonus ball. Since the number of remaining balls is 43, and the ticket has 1 unmatched number remaining,  of these 258 combinations will match the next ball drawn (the powerball), leaving  ways of achieving it.

The general formula for  matching balls in a  choose  lottery with one bonus ball from the  pool of balls is: 

The general formula for  matching balls in a  choose  lottery with zero bonus ball from the  pool of balls is:

The general formula for  matching balls in a  choose  lottery with one bonus ball from a separate pool of  balls is:

The general formula for  matching balls in a  choose  lottery with no bonus ball from a separate pool of  balls is:

Minimum number of tickets for a match

It is a hard (and often open) problem to calculate the minimum number of tickets one needs to purchase to guarantee that at least one of these tickets matches at least 2 numbers. In the 5-from-90 lotto, the minimum number of tickets that can guarantee a ticket with at least 2 matches is 100.

Information theoretic results 

As a discrete probability space, the probability of any particular lottery outcome is atomic, meaning it is greater than zero.  Therefore, the probability of any event is the sum of probabilities of the outcomes of the event.  This makes it easy to calculate quantities of interest from information theory. For example, the information content of any event is easy to calculate, by the formula 

In particular, the information content of outcome  of discrete random variable  is

The information content of winning is 

shannons or bits of information. (See units of information for further explanation of terminology.) The information content of losing is 

 

The information entropy of a lottery probability distribution is also easy to calculate as the expected value of the information content.  

 

Oftentimes the random variable of interest in the lottery is a Bernoulli trial. In this case, the Bernoulli entropy function may be used. Using  representing winning the 6-of-49 lottery, the Shannon entropy of 6-of-49 above is

References

External links
 Euler's Analysis of the Genoese Lottery – Convergence (August 2010), Mathematical Association of America
 Lottery Mathematics – INFAROM Publishing
 13,983,816 and the Lottery – YouTube video with James Clewett, Numberphile, March 2012

Mathematics
Combinatorics
Gambling mathematics